Reid is a Scottish surname.

Reid may also refer to:

Given name
 Reid Anderson, jazz bassist
 Reid Detmers, American baseball player
 Reid Duke, American professional Magic: the Gathering player
 Reid Hamilton, a very influential Latino activist from the Chicano movement
 Reid Hershel, a fictional character in the video game Tales of Eternia
 Reid Sinnett (born 1996), American football player
 Reid Travis (born 1995), American basketball player

Places
 Reid, Australian Capital Territory, inner suburb of Canberra, Australia
 Division of Reid, a Sydney electorate in the Australian House of Representatives
 Reid, Maryland, census-designated place in Washington County
 Reid, West Virginia
 Utica Avenue, in Brooklyn, New York City; the northern portion was formerly Reid Avenue
 Reid Rocks, small rocky islet in western Bass Strait, Tasmania, Australia

Ships
 , the name of various United States Navy ships
 USS Beverly W. Reid (DE-722), a United States Navy destroyer escort converted during construction into the high-speed transport USS Beverly W. Reid (APD-119)
 , a United States Navy high-speed transport in commission from 1945 to 1947 and from 1967 to 1969

Other uses
 Reid camera, manufactured by Reid and Sigrist, based on Leica designs
 Reid technique, a method of interrogation
 The Reid vapor pressure, a measure of the volatility of gasoline

See also
 Reed (disambiguation)
 Read (disambiguation)
 Reid's, a hotel in Funchal, Madeira
 Reed (name)
 Read (surname)
 Reade (disambiguation)
 Rhead
 Ried (disambiguation)
 Justice Reid (disambiguation)

Surnames from nicknames